Scotch Plains Baptist Church is a historic Baptist church located at Park Avenue in Scotch Plains, New Jersey. The associated nearby Old Baptist Parsonage is a historic church parsonage, located at 347 Park Avenue, which was built in 1786 and listed on the National Register of Historic Places in 1973.

History
The present church is located in an American Revolutionary War-era cemetery known as "God’s Little Acre", with Watchung Mountains-quarried brown sandstone grave markers dating back to 1742. The original church dated from the early 18th century. After a fire, it was rebuilt around 1816. The present church was built in 1871 in a Gingerbread Ruskinian Gothic style “made of pressed brick with Ohio stone and white brick trimmings.”

Buried the church's cemetery is Caesar, who died on February 7, 1806, at 104 years of age. He was born in Africa and brought to America as a slave. He was freed from slavery in 1769. During the Revolutionary War Caesar drove a wagon and delivered supplies to the Continental troops at Blue Hills Fort and Camp.

References

External links
Official website

Baptist churches in New Jersey
Churches completed in 1870
Churches in Union County, New Jersey
Gothic Revival church buildings in New Jersey
Churches completed in 1816
Demolished churches in the United States
Scotch Plains, New Jersey
Church fires in the United States
Demolished buildings and structures in New Jersey
National Register of Historic Places in Union County, New Jersey